Vilhelm Teodor Rosenqvist (14 October 1856, in Lapinjärvi – 26 October 1925) was a Finnish secondary school teacher and politician. He was a member of the Diet of Finland from 1899 to 1906 and of the Parliament of Finland from 1907 to 1909, representing the Swedish People's Party of Finland (SFP). He was the younger brother of Gustaf Rosenqvist.

References

1856 births
1925 deaths
People from Lapinjärvi
People from Uusimaa Province (Grand Duchy of Finland)
Swedish-speaking Finns
Finnish Lutherans
Swedish People's Party of Finland politicians
Members of the Diet of Finland
Members of the Parliament of Finland (1907–08)
Members of the Parliament of Finland (1908–09)
University of Helsinki alumni